This is a list of philosophers from the Western tradition of philosophy.

Western philosophers

Greek philosophers

600–500 BCE
 Thales of Miletus (c. 624 – 546 BCE). Of the Milesian school. Believed that all was made of water.
 Pherecydes of Syros (c. 620 – c. 550 BCE). Cosmologist.
 Anaximander of Miletus (c. 610 – 546 BCE). Of the Milesian school. Famous for the concept of Apeiron, or "the boundless".
 Anaximenes of Miletus (c. 585 – 525 BCE). Of the Milesian school. Believed that all was made of air.
 Pythagoras of Samos (c. 580 – c. 500 BCE). Of the Ionian School. Believed the deepest reality to be composed of numbers, and that souls are immortal.
 Xenophanes of Colophon (c. 570 – 480 BCE). Advocated monotheism. Sometimes associated with the Eleatic school.
 Epicharmus of Kos (c. 530 – 450 BCE). Comic playwright and moralist.

500–400 BCE
 Heraclitus of Ephesus (c. 535 – c. 475 BCE). Of the Ionians. Emphasized the mutability of the universe.
 Parmenides of Elea (c. 515 – 450 BCE). Of the Eleatics. Reflected on the concept of Being.
 Anaxagoras of Clazomenae (c. 500 – 428 BCE). Of the Ionians. Pluralist.
 Empedocles (492 – 432 BCE). Eclectic cosmogonist. Pluralist.
 Zeno of Elea (c. 490 – 430 BCE). Of the Eleatics. Known for his paradoxes.
 Protagoras of Abdera (c. 481 – 420 BCE). Sophist. Early advocate of relativism.
 Antiphon (480 – 411 BCE). Sophist.
 Hippias (Middle of the 5th century BCE). Sophist.
 Gorgias. (c. 483 – 375 BCE). Sophist. Early advocate of solipsism.
 Socrates of Athens (c. 470 – 399 BCE). Emphasized virtue ethics. In epistemology, understood dialectic to be central to the pursuit of truth.
 Critias of Athens (c. 460 – 413 BCE). Atheist writer and politician.
 Prodicus of Ceos (c. 465 – c. 395 BCE). Sophist.
 Leucippus of Miletus (First half of the 5th century BCE). Founding Atomist, Determinist.
 Thrasymachus of Miletus (c. 459 – c. 400 BCE). Sophist.
 Democritus of Abdera (c. 450 – 370 BCE). Founding Atomist.
 Diagoras of Melos (c. 450 – 415 BCE). Atheist.
 Archelaus. A pupil of Anaxagoras.
 Melissus of Samos. Eleatic.
 Cratylus. Follower of Heraclitus.
 Ion of Chios. Pythagorean cosmologist.
 Echecrates. Pythagorean.
 Timaeus of Locri. Pythagorean.

400–300 BCE
 Antisthenes (c. 444 – 365 BCE). Founder of Cynicism. Pupil of Socrates.
 Aristippus of Cyrene (c. 440 – 366 BCE). A Cyrenaic. Advocate of ethical hedonism.
 Alcidamas c. 435 – c. 350 BCE). Sophist.
 Lycophron (Sophist) c. 430 – c. 350 BCE). Sophist.
 Diogenes of Apollonia (c. 425 – c 350 BCE). Cosmologist.
 Hippo (c. 425 – c 350 BCE). Atheist cosmologist.
 Xenophon (c. 427 – 355 BCE). Historian.
 Plato (c. 427 – 347 BCE). Famed for view of the transcendental forms. Advocated polity governed by philosophers.
 Speusippus (c. 408 – 339 BCE). Nephew of Plato.
 Eudoxus of Cnidus (c. 408 – 355 BCE). Pupil of Plato.
 Diogenes of Sinope (c. 404 – 323 BCE). Cynic.
 Xenocrates (c. 396 – 314 BCE). Disciple of Plato.
 Aristotle (c. 384 – 322 BCE). A polymath whose works ranged across all philosophical fields.

Hellenistic era philosophers

300–200 BCE
 Theophrastus (c. 371 – c. 287 BCE). Peripatetic.
 Pyrrho of Elis (c. 360 – 270 BCE). Skeptic.
 Strato of Lampsacus (c. 340 – c. 268 BCE). Atheist, Materialist.
 Theodorus the Atheist (c. 340 – c. 250 BCE). Cyrenaic.
 Epicurus (c. 341 – 270 BCE). Materialist Atomist, hedonist. Founder of Epicureanism
 Zeno of Citium (c. 333 – 264 BCE). Founder of Stoicism.
 Timon (c. 320 – 230 BCE). Pyrrhonist, skeptic.
 Aristarchus of Samos (c. 310 – c. 230 BCE). Astronomer.
 Euclid (fl. 300 BCE). Mathematician, founder of geometry.
 Archimedes  (c. 287 – c. 212 BCE). Mathematician and inventor.
 Chrysippus of Soli (c. 280 – 207 BCE). Major figure in Stoicism.
 Eratosthenes (c. 276 BC – c. 195/194 BCE). Geographer and mathematician.

200–100 BCE

 Carneades (c. 214 – 129 BCE). Academic skeptic. Understood probability as the purveyor of truth.
 Hipparchus of Nicaea (c. 190 – c. 120 BCE). Astronomer and mathematician, founder of trigonometry.

Roman era philosophers

100 BCE – 1 CE
 Cicero (c. 106 BCE – 43 BCE) Skeptic. Political theorist.
 Lucretius (c. 99 – 55 BCE). Epicurean.

1–100 CE
 Jesus of Nazareth (c. 4 BCE – 30 or 33 CE) the founder of Christianity.
 Philo (c. 20 BCE – 50 CE). Believed in the allegorical method of reading texts.
 Seneca the Younger (c. 4 BCE – 65 CE). Stoic.
 Quintilian (c. 35 CE – c. 100 CE). Rhetorician and teacher.
 Hero of Alexandria (c. 10 CE – c. 70 CE). Engineer.

100–200 CE
 Epictetus (c. 55 – 135). Stoic. Emphasized ethics of self–determination.
 Marcus Aurelius (121–180). Stoic.

200–400 CE
 Sextus Empiricus (fl. during the 2nd and possibly the 3rd centuries AD). Skeptic, Pyrrhonist.
 Plotinus (c. 205 – 270). Neoplatonist. Had a holistic metaphysics.
 Porphyry (c. 232 – 304). Student of Plotinus.
 Iamblichus of Syria (c. 245 – 325). Late neoplatonist. Espoused theurgy.
 Augustine of Hippo (c. 354 – 430). Neoplatonist. Original Sin.  Church father.
 Proclus (c. 412 – 485). Neoplatonist.

Medieval philosophers

500–800 CE
 Boethius (c. 480–524).
 John Philoponus (c. 490–570).
 Pseudo-Dionysius the Areopagite (c. 500?).
 John of Damascus (c. 680-750).

800–900 CE
 Al-Kindi (c. 801 – 873). Major figure in Islamic philosophy. Influenced by Neoplatonism.
 Abbas ibn Firnas (809–887). Polymath.
 John the Scot (c. 815 – 877). neoplatonist, pantheist.

900–1000 CE
 al–Faràbi (c. 870 – 950). Major Islamic philosopher. Neoplatonist.
 Saadia Gaon (c. 882 – 942). Jewish Philosopher
 al-Razi (c. 865 – 925). Rationalist. Major Islamic philosopher. Held that God creates universe by rearranging pre–existing laws.

1000–1100 CE
 Al-Biruni  (973– after 1050) Islamic polymath.
 Ibn Sina (Avicenna) (c. 980–1037). Major Islamic philosopher.
 Ibn Hazm (7 November 994 – 15 August 1064)
 Ibn Gabirol (Avicebron) (c. 1021–1058). Jewish philosopher.
 Anselm (c. 1034–1109). Christian philosopher. Produced ontological argument for the existence of God.
 Omar Khayyam (c. 1048–1131). Major Islamic philosopher. Agnostic. Mathematician. Philosophical poet, one of the 5 greatest Iranian Poets.
 Al-Ghazali (c. 1058–1111). Islamic philosopher. Mystic.

1100–1200 CE 
 Bahya ibn Paquda (c. 1050-1150). Jewish philosopher, author, rabbi, judge.
 Ibn Tufail (c. 1105 – 1185)
 Peter Abelard (c. 1079–1142). Scholastic philosopher. Dealt with the problem of universals.
 Abraham ibn Daud (c. 1110–1180). Jewish philosophy.
 Peter Lombard (c. 1100–1160). Scholastic.
 Averroes (Ibn Rushd, "The Commentator") (c. 1126–December 10, 1198). Islamic philosopher.
 Maimonides (c. 1135–1204). Jewish philosopher.
 Fakhr al-Din al-Razi (1149 or 1150 – 1209)
 Suhrawardi (c. 1154–1191). Major Islamic philosopher.
 Francis of Assisi (c. 1182–1226). Ascetic.

1200–1300 CE
 Ibn Arabi (1165–1240). Andalusian Muslim philosopher, mystic, poet, and scholar. Founder of Akbarism, one of the major current of later Islamic philosophy.
 Fibonacci (c. 1170–c. 1250), mathematician.
 Michael Scot (1175–c. 1232), mathematician.
 Robert Grosseteste (c. 1175–1253).
 Alexander of Hales (c. 1185-1245). Franciscan, Scholasticism.
 Albert the Great (Albertus Magnus) (c. 1193–1280). Early Empiricist.
 Roger Bacon (c. 1214–1294). Empiricist, mathematician.
 Ibn Sab'in (1217–1271).
 Thomas Aquinas (c. 1221–1274). Aristotelian.
 Bonaventure (c. 1225–1274). Franciscan.
 Siger (c. 1240–c. 1280). Averroist.
 Boetius of Dacia. Averroist, Aristotelian.

1300–1400 CE
 Ramon Llull (c. 1232–1315) Catalan philosopher
 Meister Eckhart (c. 1260–1328). mystic.
 Ibn Taymiyya (c. 1263-1328) Islamic scholar, jurist and philosopher
 Duns Scotus (c. 1266–1308). Franciscan, Scholastic, Original Sin.
 Marsilius of Padua (c. 1270–1342). Understood chief function of state as mediator.
 William of Ockham (c. 1288–1348). Franciscan. Scholastic. Nominalist, creator of Ockham's razor.
 Gersonides (c. 1288–1344). Jewish philosopher.
 Jean Buridan (c. 1300–1358). Nominalist.
 John Wycliffe (c. 1320–1384).
 Nicole Oresme (c. 1320–5 – 1382). Made contributions to economics, science, mathematics, theology and philosophy.
 Ibn Khaldun (1332 – 1406).
 Hasdai Crescas (c. 1340 – c. 1411). Jewish philosopher.
 Gemistus Pletho (c. 1355 – 1452/1454). Late Byzantine scholar of neoplatonic philosophy.

1400–1500 CE
 Nicholas of Cusa (1401–1464). Christian philosopher.
 Lorenzo Valla (1407–1457). Humanist, critic of scholastic logic.
 Marsilio Ficino (1433–1499). Christian Neoplatonist, head of Florentine Academy and major Renaissance Humanist figure. First translator of Plato's complete extant works into Latin.
 Pico della Mirandola (1463–1494). Renaissance humanist.

Early modern philosophers

1500–1550 CE
 Neagoe Basarab (c.1459–1521)
 Desiderius Erasmus (1466–1536). Humanist, advocate of free will.
 Niccolò Machiavelli (1469–1527). Political realism.
 Nicolaus Copernicus (1473–1543). Scientist, whose works affected Philosophy of Science.
 Sir Thomas More (1478–1535). Humanist, created term "utopia".
 Martin Luther (1483–1546). Major Western Christian theologian.
 Petrus Ramus (1515–1572).

1550–1600 CE
 John Calvin (1509–1564). Major Western Christian theologian.
 Michel de Montaigne (1533–1592). Humanist, skeptic.
 Pierre Charron (1541–1603).
 Giordano Bruno (1548–1600). Advocate of heliocentrism.
 Francisco Suarez (1548–1617). Politically proto–liberal.
Johannes Kepler (1571–1630). Scientist, whose works affected Philosophy of Science.
Molla-Sadra (1572–1640). Major Islamic philosopher.

1600–1650 CE
 Herbert of Cherbury (1583–1648). Nativist.
 Francis Bacon (1561–1626). Empiricist.
 Galileo Galilei (1564–1642). Heliocentrist.
 Hugo Grotius (1583–1645). Natural law theorist.
 François de La Mothe Le Vayer (1588–1672)
 Marin Mersenne (1588–1648). Cartesian.
 Robert Filmer (1588–1653). Absolutist, monarchist, patrimonialist. Divine right of kings.
 Pierre Gassendi (1592–1655). Mechanicism. Empiricist.
 René Descartes (1596–1650). Heliocentrism, mind-body dualism, rationalism.
 Baltasar Gracián (1601–1658). Spanish catholic philosopher

1650–1700 CE
 Thomas Hobbes (1588–1679). Advocate of extensive government power, social contract theorist, materialist.
 Antoine Arnauld (1612–1694).
 François de La Rochefoucauld (1613-1680).
 Henry More (1614–1687).
 Jacques Rohault (1617–1672), Cartesian.
 Ralph Cudworth (1617–1688). Cambridge Platonist.
 Blaise Pascal (1623–1662). Physicist, scientist. Noted for Pascal's wager.
 Margaret Cavendish (1623–1673). Materialist, feminist.
 Arnold Geulincx (1624–1669). Important occasionalist theorist.
 Pierre Nicole (1625–1695).
 Geraud Cordemoy (1626–1684). Dualist.
 Robert Boyle (1627–1691).
 Anne Conway, Viscountess Conway (1631–1679).
 Richard Cumberland (1631–1718). Early proponent of utilitarianism.
 Baruch Spinoza (1632–1677). Rationalism.
 Samuel von Pufendorf (1632–1694). Social contract theorist.
 John Locke (1632–1704). Major Empiricist. Political philosopher.
 Joseph Glanvill (1636–1680).
 Nicolas Malebranche (1638–1715). Cartesian.
 Isaac Newton (1643–1727).
 Simon Foucher (1644–1696). Skeptic.
 John Flamsteed (1646 – 1719). Astronomer.
 Pierre Bayle (1647–1706). Pyrrhonist.
 Damaris Masham (1659–1708).
 John Toland (1670–1722).
 Dimitrie Cantemir (1674-1723)

1700–1750 CE
 Gottfried Leibniz (1646–1716). Co-inventor of calculus.
 John Norris (1657–1711).
 Jean Meslier (1664–1729). Atheist Priest.
 Giambattista Vico (1668–1744).
 Bernard Mandeville (1670–1733).
 Anthony Ashley-Cooper (1671–1713).
 Samuel Clarke (1675–1729).
 Catherine Cockburn (1679–1749).
 Christian Wolff (1679–1754). Determinist, rationalist.
 George Berkeley (1685–1753). Idealist, empiricist.
 Charles de Secondat, Baron de Montesquieu (1689–1755). Skeptic, humanist.
 Joseph Butler (1692–1752).
 Francis Hutcheson (1694–1746). Proto–utilitarian.
 John Gay (1699–1745).
 Jonathan Edwards (1703-1758). American philosophical theologian.
 David Hartley (1705–1757).
 Julien La Mettrie (1709–1751). Materialist, genetic determinist.

1750–1800 CE
 Voltaire (1694–1778). Advocate for freedoms of religion and expression.
 Thomas Reid (1710–1796). Member of Scottish Enlightenment, founder of Scottish Common Sense philosophy.
 David Hume (1711–1776). Empiricist, skeptic.
 Jean–Jacques Rousseau (1712–1778). Social contract political philosopher.
 Denis Diderot (1713–1784).
 Alexander Gottlieb Baumgarten (1714–1762).
 Claude Adrien Helvétius (1715–1771). Utilitarian.
 Etienne de Condillac (1715–1780).
 Jean d'Alembert (1717–1783).
 Baron d'Holbach (1723–1789). Materialist, atheist.
 Adam Smith (1723–1790). Economic theorist, member of Scottish Enlightenment.
 Richard Price (1723–1791). Political liberal.
 Immanuel Kant (1724–1804). Major contributions in nearly every field of philosophy, especially metaphysics, epistemology, ethics, and aesthetics.
 Moses Mendelssohn (1729–1786). Member of the Jewish Enlightenment.
 Gotthold Ephraim Lessing (1729–1781).
 Edmund Burke (1729–1797). Conservative political philosopher.
 Johann Georg Hamann (1730–1788).
 Cesare Beccaria (1738–1794). Italian criminologist, jurist, and philosopher from the Age of Enlightenment.
 William Paley (1743–1805).
 Thomas Jefferson (1743–1826). Liberal political philosopher.
 Friedrich Heinrich Jacobi (1743–1819).
 Johann Gottfried von Herder (1744–1803).
 Jeremy Bentham (1748–1832). Utilitarian, hedonist.
 Sylvain Maréchal (1750–1803) Anarcho-Communist, Deist
 Dugald Stewart (1753–1828).
 Salomon Maimon (1753–1800).
 William Godwin (1756–1836). Anarchist, utilitarian.
 Karl Leonhard Reinhold (1757–1823). Kantian.
 Mary Wollstonecraft (1759–1797). Feminist.
 Friedrich Schiller (1759–1805).
 Gottlob Ernst Schulze (1761–1833). Skeptic.
 Johann Gottlieb Fichte (1762–1814).

Modern philosophers

1800–1850 CE
 Jean-Baptiste Lamarck (1744–1829). Early evolutionary theorist.
 Pierre-Simon Laplace (1749–1827). Determinist.
 Joseph de Maistre (1753–1821) Conservative
 Comte de Saint-Simon (1760–1825). Socialist.
 Madame de Staël (1766–1817).
 Friedrich Schleiermacher (1768–1834). Hermeneutician.
 Friedrich Hölderlin (1770–1843). Poet and philosopher.
 G. W. F. Hegel (1770–1831). German idealist.
 James Mill (1773–1836). Utilitarian.
 F. W. J. von Schelling (1775–1854). German idealist.
 Bernard Bolzano (1781–1848).
 Richard Whately (1787–1863).
 Arthur Schopenhauer (1788–1860). Pessimism, Critic, Absurdist.
 John Austin (1790–1859). Legal positivist, utilitarian.
 William Whewell (1794–1866).
 Auguste Comte (1798–1857). Social philosopher, positivist.
 Ralph Waldo Emerson (1803–1882). Transcendentalist, abolitionist, egalitarian, humanist.
 Ludwig Feuerbach (1804–1872).
 Alexis de Tocqueville (1805–1859).
 Max Stirner (1806–1856). Anarchist.
 Augustus De Morgan (1806–1871). Logician.
 John Stuart Mill (1806–1873). Utilitarian.
 Pierre-Joseph Proudhon (1809–1865). Anarchist.
 Charles Darwin (1809–1882). Scientist, whose works affected Philosophy of Science.
 Jaime Balmes (1810–1848)
 Margaret Fuller (1810–1850). Egalitarian.
 Søren Kierkegaard (1813–1855). Existentialist.
 Henry David Thoreau (1817–1862). Transcendentalist, pacifist, abolitionist.

1850–1900 CE
 Sir William Hamilton, 9th Baronet (1788–1856).
 Sojourner Truth (c. 1797–1883). Egalitarian, abolitionist.
 Harriet Taylor Mill (1807–1858). Egalitarian, utilitarian.
 Mikhail Bakunin (1814–1876). Revolutionary anarchist.
 Elizabeth Cady Stanton (1815–1902). Egalitarian.
 Hermann Lotze (1817–1881).
 Karl Marx (1818–1883). Socialist, formulated historical materialism.
 Friedrich Engels (1820–1895). Egalitarian, dialectical materialist.
 Herbert Spencer (1820–1903). Nativism, libertarianism, social Darwinism.
 Susan B. Anthony (1820–1906). Feminist.
 Wilhelm Dilthey (1833–1911).
 Edward Caird (1835–1908). Idealist.
 T.H. Green (1836–1882). British idealist.
 Henry Sidgwick (1838–1900). Rationalism, utilitarianism.
 Ernst Mach (1838–1916). Philosopher of science, influence on logical positivism.
 Franz Brentano (1838–1917). Phenomenologist.
 Charles Sanders Peirce (1839–1914). Pragmatist.
 Philipp Mainländer (1841-1876). Pessimist.
 William James (1842–1910). Pragmatism, Radical empiricism.
 Hermann Cohen (1842-1918). Neo-Kantianism, Jewish philosophy.
 Peter Kropotkin (1842–1921). Anarchist communism.
 Friedrich Nietzsche (1844–1900). Naturalistic philosopher, influence on Existentialism.
 W. K. Clifford (1845–1879). Evidentialist.
 F. H. Bradley (1846–1924). Idealist.
 Vilfredo Pareto (1848–1923). Social philosopher.
 Bernard Bosanquet (1848–1923). Idealist.
 Gottlob Frege (1848–1925). Influential analytic philosopher.
 Cook Wilson (1849–1915).
 Hans Vaihinger (1852–1933). Specialist in counterfactuals.
 David George Ritchie (1853–1903). Idealist.
 Alexius Meinong (1853–1920). Logical realist.
 Henri Poincaré (1854–1912).
 Josiah Royce (1855–1916). Idealist.
 Sigmund Freud (1856–1939). Neurologist, founded psychoanalysis, posited structural model of mind.
 Andrew Seth Pringle-Pattison (1856–1931).
 Ferdinand de Saussure (1857–1913). Linguist, Semiotics, Structuralism.
 Émile Durkheim (1858–1917). Social philosopher.
 Giuseppe Peano (1858–1932).
 Edmund Husserl (1859–1938). Founder of phenomenology.
 Samuel Alexander (1859–1938). Perceptual realist.
 Henri Bergson (1859–1941). Vitalism.
 John Dewey (1859–1952). Pragmatism.
 Jane Addams (1860–1935). Pragmatist.
 Pierre Duhem (1861–1916).
 Rudolf Steiner (1861–1925).Anthroposophy
 Karl Groos (1861–1946). Evolutionary instrumentalist theory of play.
 Alfred North Whitehead (1861–1947). Process Philosophy, Mathematician, Logician, Philosophy of Physics, Panpsychism.
 George Herbert Mead (1863–1931). Pragmatism, symbolic interactionist.
 Max Weber (1864–1920). Social philosopher.
 Miguel de Unamuno (1864–1936).
 J. M. E. McTaggart (1866–1925). Idealist.
 Benedetto Croce (1866–1952).
 Emma Goldman (1869–1940). Anarchist.
 Rosa Luxemburg (1870–1919). Marxist political philosopher.
 G. E. Moore (1873–1958). Common sense theorist, ethical non–naturalist.
 Carl Jung (1875–1961). Psychoanalysis, Methaphysics

1900–2000 CE
 George Santayana (1863–1952). Pragmatism, naturalism; known for many aphorisms.
 H.A. Prichard (1871–1947). Moral intuitionist.
 Bertrand Russell (1872–1970). Analytic philosopher, nontheist, influential.
 A.O. Lovejoy (1873–1962).
 Nikolai Berdyaev (1874–1948). Existentialist.
 Ernst Cassirer (1874–1945).
 Max Scheler (1874–1928). German phenomenologist.
 Giovanni Gentile (1875–1944). Idealist and fascist philosopher.
 Ralph Barton Perry (1876–1957).
 W.D. Ross (1877–1971). Deontologist.
 Martin Buber (1878–1965). Jewish philosopher, existentialist.
 Ludwig von Mises (1881-1973).
 Pierre Teilhard de Chardin (1881–1955). Christian evolutionist.
 Hans Kelsen (1881–1973). Legal positivist.
 Moritz Schlick (1882–1936). Founder of Vienna Circle, logical positivism.
 Otto Neurath (1882–1945). Member of Vienna Circle.
 Nicolai Hartmann (1882–1950).
 Jacques Maritain (1882–1973). Human rights theorist.
 José Ortega y Gasset (1883–1955). Philosopher of History.
 C.I. Lewis (1883–1964). Conceptual pragmatist.
 Gaston Bachelard (1884–1962).
 Georg Lukács (1885–1971). Marxist philosopher.
 Franz Rosenzweig (1886-1929).
 Walter Terence Stace (1886–1967)
 Karl Barth (1886–1968).
 C. D. Broad (1887–1971).
 Ludwig Wittgenstein (1889–1951). Analytic philosopher, philosophy of language, philosophy of mind, influential.
 Gabriel Marcel (1889–1973). Christian existentialist.
 Martin Heidegger (1889–1976). Phenomenologist.
 Antonio Gramsci (1891–1937). Marxist philosopher.
 Rudolf Carnap (1891–1970). Vienna Circle. Logical positivist.
 Walter Benjamin (1892–1940). Marxist. Philosophy of language.
 Brand Blanshard (1892–1987).
 F. S. C. Northrop (1893–1992). Epistemologist.
 Roman Ingarden (1893–1970). Perceptual realist, phenomenalist.
 Susanne Langer (1895–1985).
 Friedrich Waismann (1896–1959). Vienna Circle. Logical positivist.
 Georges Bataille (1897–1962).
 Herbert Marcuse (1898–1979). Frankfurt School.
 Xavier Zubiri (1898–1983). Materialist open realism.
 Leo Strauss (1899–1973). Political Philosopher.
 H.H. Price (1899–1984).
 Gilbert Ryle (1900–1976).
 Hans-Georg Gadamer (1900–2002). Hermeneutics.
 Jacques Lacan (1901–1981). Structuralism.
 Henri Lefebvre (1901-1991). Marxist philosopher
 Alfred Tarski (1901–1983). Created T–Convention in semantics.
 E. Nagel (1901–1985). Logical positivist.
 Karl Popper (1902–1994). Falsificationist.
 Mortimer Adler (1902–2001).
 Frank P. Ramsey (1903–1930). Proposed redundancy theory of truth.
 Theodor Adorno (1903–1969). Frankfurt School.
 Ernest Addison Moody (1903–1975).
 Jean-Paul Sartre (1905–1980). Humanism, existentialism.
 Karl Jaspers (1883–1969). Existentialist.
 Joseph Campbell (1904-1987) comparative mythology and comparative religion
 Eugen Fink (1905–1975). Phenomenologist.
 Ayn Rand (1905–1982). Objectivist, Individualist.
 Kurt Gödel (1906–1978). Vienna Circle.
 Emmanuel Levinas (1906–1995).
 Hannah Arendt (1906–1975). Political Philosophy.
 H.L.A. Hart (1907–1992). Legal positivism.
 C.L. Stevenson (1908–1979).
 Maurice Merleau-Ponty (1908–1961). Influential French phenomenologist.
 Simone de Beauvoir (1908–1986). Existentialist, feminist.
 Willard van Orman Quine (1908–2000).
 Simone Weil (1909–1943).
 A.J. Ayer (1910–1989). Logical positivist, emotivist.
 J.L. Austin (1911–1960).
 Marshall McLuhan (1911–1980). Media theory.
 Alan Turing (1912–1954). Functionalist in philosophy of mind.
 Wilfrid Sellars (1912–1989). Influential American philosopher
 Albert Camus (1913–1960). Absurdist.
 Paul Ricœur (1913–2005). French philosopher and theologian.
 Roland Barthes (1915–1980). French semiotician and literary theorist.
 J. L. Mackie (1917–1981). Moral skeptic.
 Donald Davidson (1917–2003). Coherentist philosophy of mind.
 Louis Althusser (1918–1990). Structural Marxist.
 M. Bunge (1919–2020).
 R. M. Hare (1919–2002).
 P. F. Strawson (1919–2006). Ordinary language philosophy.
 John Rawls (1921–2002). Liberal.
 Stephen Toulmin (1922–2009).
 Thomas Kuhn (1922–1996). Author of The Structure of Scientific Revolutions.
 Zygmunt Bauman (1925–2017). Polish sociologist and philosopher, who introduced the idea of liquid modernity.
 Frantz Fanon (1925–1961). Postcolonialism
 Gilles Deleuze (1925–1995). Post-structuralism
 Michel Foucault (1926–1984). Structuralism, Post-structuralism, Postmodernism, and the concept of biopolitics.
 Hilary Putnam (1926–2016). Neopragmatism.
 David Malet Armstrong (1926–2014).
Eugene Gendlin (1926–2017). Philosopher and psychotherapist, linked to Phenomenology and Pragmatism.
 John Howard Yoder (1927–1997). Pacifist.
 Noam Chomsky (born 1928). Linguist.
 Robert M. Pirsig (1928–2017). Introduced the Methaphysics of Quality. MOQ incorporates facets of East Asian philosophy, pragmatism and the work of F. S. C. Northrop.
 Bernard Williams (1929–2003). Moral philosopher.
 Jean Baudrillard (1929–2007). Postmodernism, Post-structuralism.
 Jürgen Habermas (born 1929). Discourse ethics.
 Jaakko Hintikka (1929–2015).
 Alasdair MacIntyre (born 1929). Aristotelian.
 Allan Bloom (1930–1992). Political Philosopher.
 Pierre Bourdieu (1930–2002). French psychoanalytic sociologist and philosopher.
 Jacques Derrida (1930–2004). Deconstruction.
 Thomas Sowell (born 1930). Political Philosopher, capitalist.
 Guy Debord (1931–1994). French Marxist philosopher.
 Richard Rorty (1931–2007). Pragmatism, Postanalytic philosophy.
 Charles Taylor (born 1931). Political philosophy, Philosophy of Social Science, and Intellectual History
 John Searle (born 1932). Direct realism.
 Alvin Plantinga (born 1932). Reformed epistemology, Philosophy of Religion.
 Jerry Fodor (1935–2017).
 Ioanna Kuçuradi (born 1936). Grounded Ethics on unchangeable values of Person, and developed the idea of human rights based on this ethics.
 Thomas Nagel (born 1937). Qualia theory.
 Alain Badiou (born 1937).
 Robert Nozick (1938–2002). Libertarian.
 Tom Regan (1938–2017). Animal rights philosopher.
 Saul Kripke (born 1940). Modal semantics.
 Jean-Luc Nancy (born 1940) French philosopher.
 David K. Lewis (1941–2001). Modal realism.
 Joxe Azurmendi (born 1941). Basque Philosopher, Political philosophy, Social philosophy, Philosophy of language.
 Antonio Escohotado (1941-2021). Hegelianism, Liberal.
 Derek Parfit (1942–2017).
 Giorgio Agamben (born 1942). state of exception, form–of–life, and homo sacer.
 Gayatri Chakravorty Spivak (born 1942). Postcolonialism, Feminism, Literary theory.
 Roger Scruton (1944-2020). Traditionalist conservatism.
 Peter Singer (born 1946) Moral philosopher on animal liberation, effective altruism.
 John Ralston Saul (born 1947).
 Martha Nussbaum (born 1947). Political philosopher.
 Oruç Aruoba (1948–2020). Developed a certain approach of ethics based on how One becomes onseself through one's actions. 
 Hans-Hermann Hoppe (born 1949).
 Slavoj Žižek (born 1949). Hegelianism, Marxism and Lacanian psychoanalysis.
 Ken Wilber (born 1949). Integral Theory.
 John Dupré (born 1952)
 Cornel West (born 1953).  
 Judith Butler (born 1956). Poststructuralist, feminist, queer theory.
 Jeff Malpas (born 1958)
 Alexander Wendt (born 1958). Social constructivism.
 Michel Onfray (born 1959).
 David Benatar (born 1966). Antinatalist.
 Alain de Botton (born 1969).
 Nick Bostrom (born 1973).

See also
 Contemporary philosophy
 Timeline of German Idealism
 List of years in philosophy
 :Category:21st-century philosophers

References
  http://www.philosophypages.com
  http://lafavephilosophy.x10host.com/CRONLIST.htm

External links
Jewish Intellectual Timeline, a parallel history of Jewish and non-Jewish intellectual ideas

Western philosophers